The Bud Bowl was a stop motion animated Super Bowl advertising campaign first aired in 1989, and sporadically during the 1990s. It served as an advertisement for Anheuser-Busch's Budweiser family of beers. It featured anthropomorphized Budweiser bottles playing a football game against Bud Light bottles.

History

Bud Bowl I was aired in 1989 during the telecast of Super Bowl XXIII. It was originally created in the D'arcy Masius Benton & Bowles Account Service Dept by Tom Gooch and Rich Lalley who were looking for a way to strategically be involved with the Super Bowl. David Henke and Bill Oakley of D'arcy Masius Benton & Bowles were the creative team behind the original Bud Bowl. The 3D computer graphics promotional spots preceding the game commercials were made by San Francisco Production Group. The stop-motion filming process was painstaking, involving eight hours of work to produce just three seconds of footage.  Bud Bowl II was shot with stop motion animation by Broadcast Arts in NYC. Bud Ice and Bud Dry would make appearances in later Bud Bowls.  Beer bottles with the voices of Terry Bradshaw and Tom Landry (the latter of which was topped with Landry's distinctive fedora) also made appearances. It has been jokingly said that the Bud Bowl was actually more exciting than the Super Bowl itself in some years. Starting with the fourth edition, a consumer contest was tied to the commercials, with game pieces distributed in the product packaging. Gambling on the outcome of the Bud Bowl was also common, despite the fact that some people knew the results before the actual airing.

In later years, Bud Bowl was retained as an advertising promotion, but in different forms. Beginning with the fifth edition, the bottles were transitioned to CGI by Pacific Data Images (later PDI/DreamWorks). In the sixth edition, the CGI bottles however were done by Boss Film Studios. In 1996, it served as a contest only. Game pieces with football plays written on it were distributed, and viewers with the winning play on their piece won. By 1998, it was mostly removed from television. Bud Bowl was used often in static store display promotions, and/or contests. By 2002, it was attached to a series of local events, such as concerts, festivals, and "block parties," taking place at the host city of the Super Bowl in the days leading up to the game.

Results

In popular culture 
 In The Simpsons episode "Lisa the Greek", the "Duff Bowl" is shown.
 During halftime of Super Bowls XXVIII through XXX (1994–1996), Beavis and Butt-head specials known as Butt Bowl I, Butt Bowl II, and Butt Bowl III were aired.
 The song "Nerd Alert!" by American band The Aquabats references the games with the lyric "Get stupid on your time / Get the Bud Bowl off the air".
 Reason.tv parodied the FDA's ban on Four Loko and caffeinated alcoholic drinks with Buzz Bowl I: Four Loko vs Joose.
 During Episode 29 of Sklarbro Country, The Sklar Brothers discuss Jon Bon Jovi expressing interest in becoming part owner of the Atlanta Falcons. Claiming, "It's a sports disaster on par with the Bud Bowl VI, the worst of the Bud Bowls. They came back strong the next year, but that was a down year for them."
 An early 90s episode of Late Night with David Letterman featured a parody of the Bud Bowl animation by instead portraying it merely with rows of actual beer bottles lined up in front of each other, then being smashed across the playing field floor with a large shop broom.
 In Noah Baumbach’s 1995 debut film Kicking and Screaming, a character named Otis asks his roommate, “Who won Bud Bowl II?”

References

Anheuser-Busch advertising
Super Bowl commercials
1989 introductions
1997 disestablishments in the United States